The 1965–66 season was Cardiff City F.C.'s 39th season in the Football League. They competed in the 22-team Division Two, then the second tier of English football, finishing twentieth.

The season also saw the club reach the semi-finals of the Football League Cup, the furthest they have ever gone in the competition, before being beaten by West Ham United.

Players

League standings

Results by round

Fixtures and results

Second Division

League Cup

FA Cup

European Cup Winners Cup

Welsh Cup

See also
List of Cardiff City F.C. seasons

References

Welsh Football Data Archive

Cardiff City F.C. seasons
Association football clubs 1965–66 season
Card